Anica Dobra (born June 3, 1963) is a Serbian film and theatre actress.

Early life and education
Dobra was born on June 3, 1963, in Belgrade, where she completed primary education before moving to Frankfurt on Main with her mother. She stayed in Germany until she graduated from high school, and then returned to Serbia. In 1983, Dobra enrolled in the Faculty of Dramatic Arts at the University of Arts in Belgrade. She studied under Predrag Bajčetić, together with Nebojša Bakočević, Goran Radaković, Arijana Čulina, Milan Pleština and Dragan Mrkić. She graduated in 1987.

Dobra is married to Miodrag Sovtić. Their daughter Mina Sovtić is also an actress.

Career 
Her acting debut occurred in the second year of studies in a short film called “Pera Panker” (1985). In 1987 she got a breakthrough role in a feature film “Život radnika”. During the same year, she received the best leading actress award at the prestigious Pula Film Festival. Prominent roles in many critically acclaimed Serbian movies followed - „Već viđeno“ (1987), “Sabirni centar” (1989), “Kako je propao rokenrol” (1989), “Crni bombarder” (1992), “Točkovi” (1998), “Klopka” (2007), “Ljubav i drugi zločini” (2008), “Neko me ipak čeka” (2009), and “Enklava” (2015).

From the 1990s, Dobra appeared in over 30 international movies, predominantly from German cinematography. For her first international role in “Rosamunde” (1990) she received the Bavarian Film Award for the Best Young Actress.

Concurrently with her film career, Dobra has also been performing in theatre plays at Atelje 212, Zvezdara theatre and the Yugoslav drama theatre. Besides acting, she has also translated from German the folk play Der Drang by Franz Xaver Kroetz.

Acting credits

Film

Television

Theatre

Awards and nominations
Dobra is a recipient of numerous prizes. She has won Sterija's Award in 1991, the Golden Arena for Best Actress at the Pula Film Festival 1988, Carica Teodora award (twice) at the Film Festival in Niš, the Zoranov brk award, the Golden Turkey at the "Comedy Days" in Jagodina 1992, First Prize of the International Film festival in Vichy, Bavarian film - best young actress, the most prestigious German actor award Goldene Kamera, awards of Belgrade in 2008, the Award for Best Actress of SOFEST, AFUN award and others.

References

External links

 
 Balkan Media 
 CineMorgue, Anica Dobra
 "Führen Sie ein Doppelleben, Anica Dobra?" at welt.de (German)
 Anica Dobra: Još uvek učim da živim at hellomagazin.rs (Serbian)
 Hello Magazin, Anica Dobra at hellomagazin.rs (Serbian)
 Anica Dobra - Biografija at story.rs

Serbian film actresses
1963 births
Living people
University of Belgrade Faculty of Dramatic Arts alumni
Actresses from Belgrade
Golden Arena winners
Zoran Radmilović Award winners
20th-century Serbian actresses
21st-century Serbian actresses